Milton Lake may refer to:

Canada
Milton Lake (Saskatchewan)

United Kingdom
Milton Lake, an area of Langstone Harbour in Hampshire, England

United States
Lake Milton, Ohio
Milton Pond, New Hampshire